Union County High School is a public high school located in Liberty, Indiana, United States. It is part of the Union County–College Corner Joint School District (UCCCJSD), and was built in 1973 after the merger of Short High School (Liberty, Brownsville and Kitchel High Schools) and College Corner High School.

Athletics
Union County has been a member of the Tri-Eastern Conference since the school was founded, and has had the most success in baseball, volleyball, softball, and boys' basketball.

Mergers

See also
 List of high schools in Indiana

References

 Consolidations
  School review
 Enrollment figures

External links
 Official website
 IHSAA profile

Public high schools in Indiana
Educational institutions established in 1973
Education in Union County, Indiana
Buildings and structures in Union County, Indiana
1973 establishments in Indiana